Shadiwal Hydropower Plant (SHPP) is a small, low-head hydroelectric generation station of 13.5 megawatt generation capacity (two units of 6.75 MW each), located near Gujrat city at Shadiwal 100 kilometer North-West of Lahore, Punjab province of Pakistan, on the flows of Upper Jhelum Canal. It is a small hydropower generating plant constructed and put in commercial operation in June 1961 with the Average Annual generating capacity of 42.67 million units of least expensive electricity.

See also 

 List of dams and reservoirs in Pakistan
 List of power stations in Pakistan
 Khan Khwar Hydropower Project
 Satpara Dam
 Gomal Zam Dam
 Duber Khwar hydropower project

References 

Dams in Pakistan
Dams completed in 1961
Hydroelectric power stations in Pakistan
Energy infrastructure completed in 1961
Gujrat, Pakistan
Energy in Punjab, Pakistan